The Rockland Breakwater is a breakwater sheltering the harbor of Rockland, Maine. It was listed on the National Register of Historic Places in 2003.

Description and history
The city of Rockland is located on the west side of Penobscot Bay in the Mid Coast region of Maine.  Its harbor, long regarded as one of the finest east of Portland, was frequently used in the 19th century as a safe harbor during bad weather.  It was less than ideally suited to this task, because its large east-facing opening would still subject ships at anchor to storms with winds from the northeast.  Major storms in the 1850s highlighted the need for improved harbor protection, but federal appropriations for a project were not approved until 1880.  Between 1880 and 1900 the United States Army Corps of Engineers, under a series of Congressional appropriations, built the breakwater.  The lighthouse standing at its end was added in 1902.

It is built out of locally quarried granite, and has a roughly trapezoidal cross-section, its seaward face sloping more gradually than the harbor side, in order to better take the battering of sea waves. The visible top is formed out of coursed granite blocks. About 700,000 tons of rock were used in its construction. The breakwater is believed to be unique among Army Corps 19th-century breakwaters in its exclusive use of local materials.

See also
National Register of Historic Places listings in Knox County, Maine

References

National Register of Historic Places in Knox County, Maine
Buildings and structures completed in 1880
Transportation buildings and structures in Knox County, Maine
Buildings and structures in Rockland, Maine
Breakwaters
1880 establishments in Maine